Dhiren Shah is a cardio-thoracic surgeon. He was the first doctor to have performed a heart transplant in Gujarat, India. He performed a bypass heart surgery on a 90 year old British man in Gujarat, making it the oldest patient to be performed in the state.

References

Indian cardiac surgeons
1974 births
Living people
Medical doctors from Gujarat